William Thomson (sometimes William Thompson) was a Scottish footballer of the 1890s.

Career
Thomson played with Dumbarton (two spells), Aston Villa, Newton Heath, and Clyde. He also played internationally for Scotland.

Honours
Dumbarton
 Scottish League: Champions 1891–92
 Scottish Cup: Runner-Up 1896–97
 Dumbartonshire Cup: Winners 1890–91, 1891–92, 1892–93
 4 caps for Scotland between 1892 and 1898, scoring one goal
 1 cap for the Scottish League in 1895
 2 representative caps for Dumbartonshire between 1892 and 1898
 1 international trial for Scotland in 1892

References

External links

Year of birth missing
Year of death missing
Scottish footballers
Scotland international footballers
Scottish Football League players
English Football League players
Scottish Football League representative players
Association football wing halves
Association football forwards
Dumbarton F.C. players
Manchester United F.C. players
Aston Villa F.C. players
Clyde F.C. players